İbrahim İnal (also spelled İbrahim Yınal, died 1060) was a Seljuk warlord, the son of Yûsuf Yınal and a foster brother of the Sultan Tughril.

In 1047, Ibrahim wrested Hamadan and Kangavar from the Kakuyid ruler Garshasp I. Ibrahim later commanded a successful raid against the eastern provinces of the Byzantine Empire which culminated in the Battle of Kapetrou in September 1048. The Arab chronicler Ibn al-Athir reports that he brought back 100,000 captives and a vast booty loaded on the backs of ten thousand camels. In 1058, he revolted against his brother, but was eventually defeated and personally strangled by Toğrül with his bowstring at Baghdad.

References

Sources 
 

1060 deaths
Seljuk dynasty
Byzantine–Seljuk wars
Year of birth unknown
Generals of the Seljuk Empire